The  is a 201 m (roughly 659 ft) high-rise building in the Roppongi district of Tokyo. The tower features a hotel, apartments, a fitness center, offices, shops and restaurants. When construction was completed in 2002, the tower was the tallest building in Minato-ku, although it has since been surpassed by the Mori Tower of Roppongi Hills.

The basement of the Izumi Garden Tower is directly connected to Roppongi-itchōme Station on the Tokyo Metro Namboku Line.

Office tenants
SBI Holdings, 13th-14th, 17th-23st floors
Lombard Odier & Cie, 41st floor
Avex Group, 36th floor (since October 1, 2014)
Naturally Plus, 35th floor
RealWorld Inc., 34th floor
LGT Bank, 33rd floor
Davis Polk & Wardwell, 33rd floor
WCL Co., Ltd., 30th floor
Orrick, Herrington & Sutcliffe, 28th floor
Credit Suisse, 24th-27th floors
Skadden, Arps, Slate, Meagher & Flom, 37th floor
Morningstar, 20th floor
Electronic Arts, 18th floor
KPMG, 11th and 12th floors
PacketVideo Japan Corporation, 10th and 13th floors
Colt Technology Services Co. Ltd, 27th floor
Hays Specialist Recruitment Japan, 28th floor

Floor unconfirmed:
E-Trade

Izumi Garden Residence
Linked to Izumi Garden Tower by means of a central court and escalator system is Izumi Garden Residence, a 32-storey high-rise luxury apartment complex that caters to affluent local and foreign families.

Other amenities
Izumi Tower and its central court contain several amenities and restaurants, including a convenience center, bank, book store, clinic, and hairdresser, as well as the following:

Fitness Club Esforta
Paul (bakery and cafe)
Selfridge Cafe
Tully's Coffee
Ma Chambre (French restaurant)
Tesoro Spanish Restaurant
Warung Bali (Balinese restaurant)
3rd Burger
Doctors
Dentist
Photo Booth
Postbox

References

External links

Map

Skyscraper office buildings in Tokyo
Residential buildings completed in 2002
2002 establishments in Japan
Residential skyscrapers in Tokyo
Skyscraper hotels in Tokyo
Retail buildings in Tokyo